Khun Si is one of the seven subdistricts (tambon) of Sai Noi District, in Nonthaburi Province, Thailand. Neighbouring subdistricts are (from north clockwise) Sai Yai, Rat Niyom, Khlong Khwang, Sai Noi, Thawi Watthana, Naraphirom and Bang Phasi. In 2020 it had a total population of 5,054 people.

Administration

Central administration
The subdistrict is subdivided into 8 administrative villages (muban).

Local administration
The whole area of the subdistrict is covered by Khun Si Subdistrict Administrative Organization.

References

External links
Website of Khun Si Subdistrict Administrative Organization

Tambon of Nonthaburi province
Populated places in Nonthaburi province